The National Girl Child Day is celebrated in India every year on January 24. It was initiated in 2008 by the Ministry of Women and Child Development and the government of India, to spread public awareness about inequities that girls face in Indian society. The day is celebrated with organized programs including awareness campaigns about Save the Girl Child, child sex ratios, and the creation of a healthy and safe environment for girls. In 2019, the day was celebrated with the theme, 'Empowering Girls for a Brighter Tomorrow'.

Objectives 
 To spread awareness among people about inequalities faced by girls in the country.
 To promote awareness about the rights of girl children.
 To increase awareness on the importance of female education, health, and nutrition.

See also 
 International Day of the Girl Child
 Child marriage in India

References

External links 
 National Girl Child Day at Vikaspedia

Feminism in India
Gender equality
January observances
Women and education